This is a list of flags used by Shia Muslims.

The Shia Muslims flags usually include the color green in them, which is a symbol of Islam, also a symbol of purity, fertility and peace. Common colors in Shia Muslims flags are red, white and green; common symbols are Lion and Sun, the Zulfiqar and the Shahada.

Shia Muslims States flags

Internal Shia Muslims territories

Shia organizations

See also
 Lion and Sun
 Order of the Lion and the Sun

References

Shia Islam